Cornutiplusia is a genus of moths of the family Noctuidae.

Species
 Cornutiplusia circumflexa – Essex Y (Linnaeus, 1767)

References
 Cornutiplusia at Markku Savela's Lepidoptera and Some Other Life Forms
 Natural History Museum Lepidoptera genus database

Plusiinae